The Bålsta Party (Swedish: Bålstapartiet, BÅP) is a Swedish local political party founded in 1994 and represented in the Håbo municipal council since 1998. It is run by former June list and Social-democratic politician Owe Fröjd. The party's policies includes municipal security guards, easier planning permissions and more frequent departures for regional transit. It participates in a coalition with other municipal parties to contest the Uppsala county regional elections, called Local parties of Uppsala County.

Election results

References 

Swedish local political parties
Minor political parties in Sweden
1994 establishments in Sweden